The LaSalle Rail Bridge is a rail bridge that carries the former Illinois Central Railroad across the Illinois River in the small community of LaSalle, Illinois. The first bridge on this site was constructed in 1855, but the superstructure was entirely reconstructed in 1893.

See also
List of bridges documented by the Historic American Engineering Record in Illinois

References

Bridges completed in 1893
Bridges in LaSalle County, Illinois
Historic American Engineering Record in Illinois
Bridges over the Illinois River
Railroad bridges in Illinois
Steel bridges in the United States